is an action game developed by Grezzo and published by Nintendo for the Wii's WiiWare service. It was released in Japan on July 27, 2010.

English fan translation
On October 31, 2021, a fan released an English translation of the title.

References

External links
 

2010 video games
Action video games
Japan-exclusive video games
Nintendo games
Video games developed in Japan
Video games scored by Yoko Shimomura
Wii-only games
WiiWare games
Multiplayer and single-player video games